Erika Fazekas-Veréb (born 23 October 1963) is a Hungarian long-distance runner. She competed in the women's 10,000 metres at the 1988 Summer Olympics.

References

1963 births
Living people
Athletes (track and field) at the 1988 Summer Olympics
Hungarian female long-distance runners
Olympic athletes of Hungary
Place of birth missing (living people)
20th-century Hungarian women